County Monaghan is a former parliamentary constituency in Ireland, returning two Members of Parliament (MPs) to the House of Commons of the Parliament of the United Kingdom.

Boundaries
This constituency comprised the whole of County Monaghan.

Members of Parliament

Election results

Elections in the 1830s

 
  
  
  
  

 
  

  
 
    

Blayney succeeded to the peerage, becoming 12th Baron Blayney and causing a by-election.

   
 

 On petition, Westenra's poll was amended to 973 votes and Lucas was declared elected on 30 July 1834

Elections in the 1840s

 
  

Westenra succeeded to the peerage, becoming 3rd Baron Rossmore and causing a by-election.

Elections in the 1850s

Elections in the 1860s

Elections in the 1870s
Leslie's death caused a by-election.

Elections in the 1880s

 

Givan was appointed Crown Solicitor for Kildare and Meath, causing a by-election.

References

The Parliaments of England by Henry Stooks Smith (1st edition published in three volumes 1844–50), 2nd edition edited (in one volume) by F.W.S. Craig (Political Reference Publications 1973)

Westminster constituencies in County Monaghan (historic)
Constituencies of the Parliament of the United Kingdom established in 1801
Constituencies of the Parliament of the United Kingdom disestablished in 1885